Korolenko (Ukrainian: Короленко) is a Ukrainian surname. The root of the word Korol means King in English, ending of -enko refers to the smaller version of the root while in meaning also refers to an heir (son) of. The derivatives may include Korolyuk, Korolchuk, less common Korol after the Soviet times. It may refer to:

 Caesar Korolenko, a Russian psychiatrist
Psoy Korolenko, a pseudonym of a Russian singer
Vladimir Korolenko, a Ukrainian/Russian writer
Yakov Korolenko, a character played by Yakov Smirnoff in the TV show Night Court

See also
 

Ukrainian-language surnames